Intacto (English: Intact) is a 2001 Spanish thriller film directed and co-written by Juan Carlos Fresnadillo and starring Leonardo Sbaraglia, Eusebio Poncela, Mónica López, Antonio Dechent, and Max von Sydow. It was first released in Spain during November, 2001, and then internationally on the film festival circuit in 2002.

Rooted in magical realism, the film depicts an underground trade in luck, where fortune flows from those who have less to those who have more; the premise purports that luck can be amassed and transferred as any other commodity. The story follows several participants as they engage in literal games of chance, each one more risky than the last, to eliminate the unlucky.

Plot 
A concentration camp survivor named Samuel Berg (Max von Sydow), a preternaturally lucky fellow, runs a European casino. One of his workers is Federico (Eusebio Poncela), a man who "steals" other people's luck merely by laying a hand on them (a similar concept is used in the 2003 Las Vegas comedy-drama The Cooler).

When Samuel Berg has a falling out with Federico and takes away his powers, Federico sets out to find the luckiest man alive (Leonardo Sbaraglia), the lone survivor of a plane crash, in order to use his powers to overpower Samuel Berg in the one game he has never lost: Russian roulette.

Federico takes his partner through a series of tests in order to confirm his abilities. In the process, they approach the tightening circle of underground chance games that will eventually lead them both, and a female cop on their heels, to a final showdown with Samuel Berg.

Cast
Leonardo Sbaraglia as Tomás
Eusebio Poncela as Federico
Mónica López as Sara
Antonio Dechent as Alejandro
Max von Sydow as Sam

Reception
The review-aggregation website Rotten Tomatoes gives the film a score of 72 percent based on reviews from 72 critics, and a weighted average of 6.5 out of 10. The website's "Critics Consensus" is: "The plot gimmick is original, bolstered by stylishly intriguing setpieces." Metacritic gives it a weighted average of 59/100 based on 25 critics, indicating "mixed or average reviews".

See also 
 List of Spanish films of 2001

References

External links 
 
 
 

2001 films
2001 psychological thriller films
Films directed by Juan Carlos Fresnadillo
Films shot in Madrid
Spanish thriller films
2000s Spanish-language films
Films shot in the Canary Islands
Magic realism films
2001 directorial debut films
Films scored by Lucio Godoy
2000s Spanish films